The 2015–16 All-Ireland Intermediate Club Hurling Championship is the 12th staging of the All-Ireland Intermediate Club Hurling Championship, the Gaelic Athletic Association's secondary inter-county club hurling tournament. The championship began on 4 October 2015 and ended on 7 February 2016.

The All-Ireland final was played on 7 January 2016 at Croke Park in Dublin, between Bennettsbridge from Kilkenny and Abbeyknockmoy from Galway, in what was their first ever meeting in the final. Bennettsbridge won the match by 1-17 to 1-14 to claim their first All-Ireland title in this grade, having won the All-Ireland Club JHC title in 2015.

Connacht Intermediate Club Hurling Championship

Connacht semi-final

Connacht final

Leinster Intermediate Club Hurling Championship

Leinster quarter-finals

Leinster semi-finals

Leinster final

Munster Intermediate Club Hurling Championship

Munster quarter-finals

Munster semi-finals

Munster final

Ulster Intermediate Club Hurling Championship

Ulster quarter-finals

Ulster semi-finals

Ulster final

All-Ireland Intermediate Club Hurling Championship

All-Ireland quarter-final

All-Ireland semi-finals

All-Ireland final

References

External link
 2015–16 All-Ireland Intermediate Club Hurling Championship fixtures

All-Ireland Intermediate Club Hurling Championship
All-Ireland Intermediate Club Hurling Championship
2015